Dover is a port town in Kent, in South East England.

Dover may also refer to:

Places

Australia
 Dover, Tasmania
 Dover Island (Tasmania)
 Dover Heights, New South Wales

Canada
 Dover, Calgary, Alberta
 Dover, Newfoundland and Labrador
 Dover, Nova Scotia
 Port Dover, Ontario
 Little Dover, Nova Scotia

Singapore
 Dover, Singapore
 Dover MRT station

United Kingdom
 Dover, Kent
 Dover (UK Parliament constituency)
 Dover District
 Strait of Dover
 White Cliffs of Dover
 Port of Dover, a cross-channel port in South East England
 Dover, Greater Manchester, a location

United States
 Dover, Arkansas
 Dover, Delaware, the state capital
 Dover Air Force Base
 Bally's Dover, formerly Dover Downs, horse harness racing track
 Dover Motor Speedway, a NASCAR race track located at Bally's Dover
 Dover, Florida
 Dover, Georgia
 Dover, Idaho
 Dover, Illinois
 Dover, Indiana
 Dover, Boone County, Indiana
 Dover, Kansas
 Dover, Kentucky
 Dover, Maine, merged with Foxcroft since 1922 to form a single town
 Dover, Massachusetts, a New England town
 Dover (CDP), Massachusetts, the urban portion of the town
 Dover, Minnesota
 Dover, Missouri
 Dover, New Hampshire
 Dover, New Jersey
 Dover, New York
 Dover, North Carolina
 Dover, Ohio
 Dover, Oklahoma
 Dover, Pennsylvania, involved in the Dover trial
 Dover, Tennessee
 Dover, Utah, a ghost town
 Dover, Vermont
 Dover, Virginia
 Dover, Buffalo County, Wisconsin, a town
 Dover, Price County, Wisconsin, an unincorporated community
 Dover, Racine County, Wisconsin, a town
 Dover Plains, New York
 Dover Township (disambiguation) (any of several townships)

People
 Dover (surname), a surname of Celtic origin appearing in English and German names

Arts and entertainment
 Dover (film), a 1943 WWII documentary short
 Dover (band), a Spanish rock band
 The Dovers, American garage-rock band

Buildings
 Dover Castle, Kent, England
 Dover House, a Grade I listed building in Whitehall, London

Companies
 Dover Corporation, a diversified industrial manufacturer
 Dover Publications, American publisher of books and, for a time, classical records
 Dover Records, an English popular record label (for the American label, see above)

Government and law
 Dover (UK Parliament constituency), the Parliamentary constituency that includes Dover, England
 Kitzmiller v. Dover Area School District, a court case

Transportation and vehicles
 Dover (truck), a make of truck owned by the Hudson Motor Car Company, Detroit
 Dover station (MBTA), a closed station on the MBTA Orange Line
 Dover station (NJ Transit), train station in Dover, New Jersey
 Dover Transit Center, bus terminal in Dover, Delaware
 Dover Transportation Center, train station in Dover, New Hampshire
 HMS Dover, the designation of several Royal Navy ships

Other uses
 Baron Dover, a British Peerage
 Dover sole (disambiguation), two species of flatfish
 Dover Athletic, a football club based in Dover

See also
 Dovre, Norway
 White Cliffs of Dover (disambiguation)